Connect Wageningen is a local political party in the city of Wageningen. It was founded in 2017 by Mark Reijerman, a former councillor for the Stadspartij Wageningen. The aim of Connect Wageningen is to represent young people, students and internationals in Wageningen, which is home to the Wageningen University and Research (WUR).

Politics 
In its electoral program Connect Wageningen cites the construction of more affordable housing as their number one priority. Other priorities are the improvement of public transport in the city, a more comprehensive social integration program for newcomers, including free Dutch and English language classes and the development of a sustainable and circular local economy.

Election results

See also 
 Student & Starter
 STIP
 Student en Stad

References

External links 
 Connect Wageningen (in English)

Local political parties in the Netherlands
Political parties established in 2017
Wageningen
Student political organisations in the Netherlands